Rennellese Sign Language is an extinct form of home sign documented from Rennell Island in 1974. It was developed about 1915 by a deaf person named Kagobai and used by his hearing family and friends, but apparently died with him; he was the only deaf person on the island, and there never was an established, self-replicating community of signers. Accordingly, in January 2017 its ISO 639-3 code [rsi] was retired. Kuschel, the only source of information about this communication system, cites no evidence to suggest that there was any contact with any sign language.

References

Home sign
Languages of the Solomon Islands
Rennell and Bellona Islands
Languages attested from the 1970s
Languages extinct in the 2000s
Extinct sign languages